Christensen Glacier is a glacier which flows to the south coast of the island of Bouvetøya,  east of Cato Point. It was first charted in 1898 by a German expedition under Carl Chun, and recharted in December 1927 by a Norwegian expedition under Captain Harald Horntvedt. It was named by Horntvedt after Lars Christensen, the sponsor of the expedition.

See also
 List of glaciers in the Antarctic
 Glaciology

References 

Glaciers of Bouvet Island